Tompkins Consolidated Area Transit, Inc., usually referred to as TCAT, is a private, non-profit public transportation operator, created by Cornell University, Tompkins County, and the City of Ithaca to serve Tompkins County, New York. The vast majority of TCAT bus routes are based in the City of Ithaca and surrounding urban area. These routes serve Ithaca College, Cornell University, and Tompkins Cortland Community College.

As of 2019, TCAT operates 34 bus routes. Door to door paratransit service is provided by GADABOUT Transportation Services, Inc.

History 

Tompkins Consolidated Area Transit (TCAT) was formed in 1998 by consolidating three public transit systems – Ithaca Transit (City of Ithaca), TOMTRAN (Tompkins County) and CU Transit (Cornell University) into a single system. In the 1960s the City and Cornell established independent bus systems which expanded throughout the next two decades. Service was first extended to serve Ithaca's suburbs in the 1970s, and to rural towns beginning in 1982. In 1974, a transit service in Northeast Ithaca (Lansing, Cayuga Heights and the Town of Ithaca) was started by apartment owners contracting with Swarthout Coaches to operate limited service for Cornell students, and as the public demand for service increased, the apartment owners sought assistance from local governments and Cornell University, which became Northeast Transit in 1978.

Tompkins County became involved in supporting suburban routes and in developing rural transit service. The County formed TOMTRAN to extend fixed-route bus service to Dryden, Caroline and Newark Valley in 1982, Groton (1983), Newfield and Ulysses (1985), and Lansing and Danby (1991). In 1999, TCAT initiated bus service to Enfield, the last unserved town in the county. In 1992, the city, Cornell and County built a $5 million transit facility to base transit operations and fleet maintenance including GADABOUT. In 1996, the New York State Legislature adopted a state law authorizing that "the county of Tompkins, the city of Ithaca and Cornell University may jointly provide for mass transportation services in the county of Tompkins.", and on April 1, 1998, the City of Ithaca, Cornell University and Tompkins County established TCAT as a joint venture (public entity) to operate public transit service in Tompkins County, service began in 1999, establishing a unified route and fare system. TCAT re-organized itself as a 501(c)(3) nonprofit corporation, TCAT. Inc. in 2005 with representatives of City of Ithaca, Cornell University, and Tompkins County serving on its board of directors.

In 1976, a consortium of municipalities and human service agencies formed GADABOUT Transportation Services to address travel needs of seniors and people with disabilities and today operates the Federally mandated paratransit service for Tompkins County. Although GADABOUT did not join TCAT in 1998, the two companies are still closely related, with GADABOUT leasing space and maintenance services from TCAT.

Routes 
As of December 2019, thirty-six bus routes comprise the TCAT system. Routes are identified by number and are usually indicated on a marquee at the front of the bus, and sometimes on the side as well. TCAT's main hub is Green Street Station, off of the Commons, a two-block pedestrian mall in downtown Ithaca. Most non South Hill routes run through the Cornell University campus; East Avenue and Tower Road near Uris and Statler Halls is considered a secondary hub.

Urban and Suburban Services: Routes 10 to 17, Routes 30 to 32, Route 51, and Routes 70 to 77

Rural Routes (Former TOMTRAN Routes): Routes 20 to 21, 36 to 43, 52 to 67, and 74 to 75

Cornell University Campus Services (Former CU Transit Routes): Routes 81 to 93

Fleet 
TCAT operates a mix of fifty-one 35 ft and 40 ft transit buses and three small 14-seat buses. All TCAT buses are wheelchair accessible. The fleet is composed of vehicles manufactured by Gillig, Nova Bus, New Flyer Industries, and Orion Bus Industries.

Current fleet

Fares 
TCAT charges an adult fare at $1.50 for all trips. Cash customers are entitled to one free transfer upon request. Seniors and those with disabilities pay half-fare, as do children under 18. Additionally, up to three children, aged five or younger, travel free with an adult.

Historical images

Sources

External links 
 

Bus transportation in New York (state)
Ithaca, New York
Cornell University
Non-profit organizations based in New York (state)
1998 establishments in New York (state)
Organizations established in 1998
501(c)(3) organizations
Transportation in Tompkins County, New York
Paratransit services in the United States